Elastinen feat. is a Finnish music program that debuted in March 2016 on MTV3, in which Finnish rapper Elastinen produces a track with the episode's guest artist. An album featuring the songs created during the show was released on 6 May 2016.

Artists such as Robin, Juha Tapio, Hector, Anna Puu and Sami Hedberg appear on the show. Jukka Immonen works as the producer for the songs on the show.

Episodes

Tracks by episode 
 Elastinen feat. Lauri Tähkä - Lempo (3:03)
 Elastinen feat. Hector - Stadi on niin snadi (2:59)
 Elastinen feat. Robin - AAAA (3:17)
 Elastinen feat. Johanna Kurkela – Oota mua (3:30)
 Elastinen feat. Sami Hedberg – Täytyy jaksaa (3:03)
 Elastinen feat. Anssi Kela – Voitais välillä elää (3:03)
 Elastinen feat. Anna Puu – Kesä '99 (3:09)
 Elastinen feat. Samu Haber – Tarpeeks täydellinen (3:00)
 Elastinen feat. Vesala – En tunne sua (2:47)
 Elastinen feat. Juha Tapio – Parasta aikaa

Charts 
The album debuted at number one in Finland.

References

External links 
  

Finnish music television series